Haflong  is a town and headquarters of Dima Hasao district  in the state of Assam in India. It is the only hill station in Assam.

Etymology
Haflong is a Dimasa word meaning ant hill.

Climate
Haflong has a subtropical highland climate (Köppen climate classification Cwb), falling just short of a tropical savanna climate (Köppen climate classification Aw). In May 2022, Haflong witnessed torrential rain fall and recorded the highest up to 451 mm on May 14, 2022 as compared to the maximum 190 mm to 200 mm reported annually.

Demographics

Population
As of 2011 India census, Haflong has a population of 43,756. Males constitute 45% of the population and females 55%. Haflong has an average literacy rate of 92%, higher than the national average of 59.5%: male literacy is 85%, and female literacy is 75%. In Haflong, 12% of the population is under 6 years of age.

Languages
Haflong town having a population of 43,756 as of 2011. Bengali is the most common spoken language of the town, followed by Dimasa, which is written in Bengali-Assamese script. Haflong Hindi is the lingua franca of the town. Other languages with significant population include Hmar, Zemi, Kuki, Hindi and Assamese.

Politics
Haflong is part of Autonomous District (Lok Sabha constituency). It is the headquarter of N.C. Hills Autonomous Council.

References

External links

Dima Hasao Website 

Cities and towns in Dima Hasao district
Dima Hasao district